Cactus is a 2008 Australian mystery-thriller film, it is the directing debut for Jasmine Yuen-Carrucan.

Synopsis
Cactus is a road movie centred on a kidnapping.

Plot
The movie begins with John Kelly pulling Eli Jones (David Lyons) from his city residence, drugging him and driving across regional Australia for three days. On the journey, John and Eli begin to interact and talk, as well as having a run-in with a rogue cop and encountering "Thommo", a trucker.

Cast
 Travis McMahon as John Kelly
 David Lyons as Eli Jones
 Bryan Brown as Rosco (the 'outback Cop')
 Shane Jacobson as Thommo
 Zoe Tuckwell-Smith as Sammy
 Daniel Krige as Mal
 Celia Ireland as Vesna
 Seymon Eckert	as Katie
 John Martin as Petrol Attendant
 Steve Rodgers	as Spuddo (voice)
 Wayne Walker as Ute Driver
 Cheyenne as Charlie Sparkles
 Craig Bartlett as Radio Operator
 Robert Whiteside as Bar Patron
 Russell Hunt as Bar Patron
 Robert Shearim as Bar Patron
 Elspeth Baird as Gardening woman

Production
The directing debut of Jasmine Yuen Carrucan was shot in New South Wales in the cities of Bathurst, Broken Hill, Cobar, Sydney and Wilcannia. Bryan Brown worked on it as executive producer.

Style
The film uses many of the classic road movie motifs such as break downs, fuel stops and long stretches of empty road, with a cinematography that is conventionally modern.

Release
The film premiered on 1 May 2008 in Australia. It was part of the Brooklyn International Film Festival in June 2008 and the Munich Film Festival on 28 June 2008.

Cultural references
Ford vs Holden rivalry

See also
 Cinema of Australia

References

External links

2008 films
2008 psychological thriller films
Australian road movies
2000s road movies
Films set in Australia
Films shot in Australia
Films scored by Nerida Tyson-Chew
Australian mystery thriller films
2008 directorial debut films
2000s English-language films